Goran Dragicevic (born December 13, 1983) is an American former professional tennis player.

Early life
Dragicevic, a native of Bosnia, moved to the United States as a late teenager. He came to the United States via Germany, where he had lived as a refugee for eight years, training at the Niki Pilic Tennis Academy in Oberschleißheim. His family had connections to New Port Richey through an uncle and settled in Florida.

Tennis career
Dragicevic competed on the professional tour mostly as a doubles specialist, with his singles appearances limited to the satellite circuit, although he did feature in qualifiers at ATP Tour events in Delray Beach and Beijing in 2005. His best doubles ranking was 103 in the world and he reached nine ATP Challenger finals, winning three titles. On the ATP Tour he was a doubles quarter-finalist at Umag in 2005 and Memphis in 2006.

Challenger titles

Doubles: (3)

References

External links
 
 

1983 births
Living people
American male tennis players
Bosnia and Herzegovina emigrants to the United States
Bosnia and Herzegovina emigrants to Germany